Rotorua Girls' High School is a state school educating girls from Year 9 to Year 13, located in Rotorua, New Zealand.

History 

Rotorua Girls' High School was formed in 1959 after Rotorua High School, founded in 1927, was divided into Rotorua Boys' High School and Rotorua Girls'.  Rotorua Boys' kept the original site, and the Rotorua Girls' was given a new site further down Old Taupo Road.

Houses 

The three houses of Rotorua Girls' High School are named after Maori women.

 Taini - Purple
 Makereti - Pink
 Witarina - Orange

Principals
 Nina Hogan 1959-1967
 Sheila Peacocke 1967-1984
 Alison Thomson 1985-1997
 Annette Joyce 1997-2013
 Ally Gibbons 2013-2018
 Sarah Davis 2019 – present

References

External links

 Rotorua Girls' High School website
 

Secondary schools in the Bay of Plenty Region
Schools in Rotorua
Girls' schools in New Zealand
Alliance of Girls' Schools Australasia